Vaghat may refer to:
 Vaghat people
 Vaghat language

Language and nationality disambiguation pages